Buhera is a village in Zimbabwe.

Location
Buhera District is in Manicaland Province, in eastern Zimbabwe.
The coordinates of Buhera Village are: 19° 19' 57.00"S, 31° 26' 6.00"E (Latitude:-19.3325; Longitude:31.4350). Economic activities in Buhera are largely mining and subsistence agriculture.

Overview
The village serves as the administrative and commercial centre for the Sabi communal lands. The economy of Buhera District depends mainly on farming, the main crops being maize, millet (mhunga) roundnuts (nyimo) and groundnuts (nzungu). Cattle ranching is also widely practised, primarily on a subsistence scale. Due to the unpredictability of the rains in the area, irrigation is required for a successful harvest. The area is fertile with several irrigation schemes for the populace to supplement their meager harvests. However the schemes are now in sorry state due to government neglect. Buhera is also divided into North, Centre, and South. Buhera district that is 100% dependent on rains yet no good rains have befallen it since 1990. With bad roads between Chivhu and Rukweza through Murambinda, it's hard to access other cities and that makes it difficult to expand in business in this arid land. Mountains like Gombe and Ngundu provides with best fruits like (mashuku or mahzanje) favored by the Shona people. Villagers find it hard to transport them because they are perishable once ripe. From Chidzikisa river you will see on the road side villagers selling this fruit from November to the first week of January.

History
The name Buhera is a Nguninised then Anglicised version of the name VuHera.  VuHera means territory of the Hera and is reference to the fact that the Hera ethnic group of the Shona lived in the area. The same ethnic group occupied neighbouring Chikomba District. The vaHera of the Museyamwa totem occupy most of the Buhera territory (under Chief Nyashanu) and much of neighbouring Chikomba (under Chief Mutekedza).

The Va Hera are of the Shona tribe and claim that they came from Guruuswa, which has been identified as an area north of the Zambezi River, perhaps around Uganda or South Sudan.
Chiurwi Mountain was a major staging point for ZANLA liberation forces, during the Second Chimurenga War (1966–1979).

Villages surrounding Buhera Centre
Muchererwa village, 
Mutara village, 
Marume village, 
Makuvise village, 
Tsotdzo village, 
Magunda village, 
Mutsindikwa village, 
Chibongodze village, 
Mukucha village, 
Magaya village, 
Mutizwa village, 
Mupungu village, 
Matsinde village, 
Makanda village.
Rwizi village, Tsvedemu village

Primary schools around Buhera Centre
Marume primary school, 
Chatindo primary school, 
Nerutanga primary school, 
Makanda primary school, 
Chikuvire primary school, 
Buhera village primary school, 
Munyira primary school.

Prominent people from Buhera
The following people are known to be born in Buhera village or nearby:
 George Charamba
 Joseph Karimanzira
 Witness Mangwende 
 Finias Munyira
 Morgan Tsvangirai
Daniel Muchuchuti
 John Makumbe
 Kumbirai Kangai
 King Shaddy
 Joseph Chinotimba
 Gideon Gono
Simbarashe Mangwengwende
 Winky D
 Passion Java
 Batsirai Java
 Otilia Matimba
 Tangwara Matimba
 Jackson Chinembiri
 Kilimanjalo
 Sugar Sugar Taruvinga Manjokota
 Michael Jeremiah
 Oliver Mandipaka
 Kumbirai Kangai
 Grace Mugabe
 Fungisai Zvakavapano Mashavave
  Donna Chibaya
  Charity Munzwembiri 
  Jackson Mudyanadzo
 Bothwell James Gift Mugariri
 Advocate Eric Matinenga
 Kenneth Manyonda

References

 
Populated places in Manicaland Province